Colegio Eugenio de Mazenod is a private school in Col.Prados de la Montaña, Cuajimalpa, Mexico City, near Santa Fe.

Founded in 1995, it previously had the Campus Contadero. The Santa Fe campus opened in 1996. In 1997 its middle school (secundaria) opened, and in 2003 its high school (bachillerato) opened.

References

External links
 Colegio Eugenio de Mazenod

High schools in Mexico City
Cuajimalpa
1995 establishments in Mexico
Educational institutions established in 1995